Gjesdal is a municipality in Rogaland county, Norway. It is located in the traditional district of Jæren. The administrative centre of the municipality is the village of Ålgård. Other villages in Gjesdal include Dirdal, Frafjord, Gilja, Gjesdal, and Oltedal.

The European route E39 highway runs through the western side of the municipality. On the east side of the municipality, the Frafjord Tunnel connects the Frafjord valley with the rest of the municipality.

The  municipality is the 187th largest by area out of the 356 municipalities in Norway. Gjesdal is the 95th most populous municipality in Norway with a population of 12,131.

General information

Name
The municipality (originally the parish) is named after the old Gjesdal farm, since the first Gjesdal Church was built there. The first element is probably an old river name and the last element is the plural form of dalr which means "valley" or "dale".

Before 1889, the name was written Gjæsdal, which is the Danish spelling. During the period from 1889 to 1917 it was spelled Gjesdal (Norwegian language version). Then starting in 1918, it was spelled Gjestal after the pronunciation of the local dialect (the d in dal is pronounced t because of the voiceless consonant s in front). In 1964, the spelling was changed back to the etymologically correct form of Gjesdal.

Coat of arms
The coat of arms was granted on 15 March 1985. The arms show a white sheep's head on a blue background. The sheet was chosen as a symbol because sheep breeding and wool manufacturing have both been important throughout the history of Gjesdal. The wool industry was centered in the village of Ålgård where wool, textile, and clothing businesses have thrived.

Churches
The Church of Norway has two parishes within the municipality of Gjesdal. It is part of the Jæren prosti (deanery) in the Diocese of Stavanger.

History
The parish of Gjæsdal was established as a municipality in 1838 (see formannskapsdistrikt law). It originally was much smaller than it is today, centered on the Gjesdalen valley in the western part of the present-day municipality. During the 1960s, there were many municipal mergers across Norway due to the work of the Schei Committee. On 1 January 1965 several areas were merged to form a much larger municipality of Gjesdal:
the original municipality of Gjesdal (population: 3,353)
the Nedre Maudal area in Bjerkreim municipality (population: 40)
the Oltesvik area along the Høgsfjorden in Høle municipality (population: 37)
the parts of Forsand municipality south and east of the Frafjorden including Dirdal, Frafjord, Byrkjedal, Øvre Maudal, and Østabødal (population: 621)

On 1 January 1970, an unpopulated area of Time Municipality was transferred to Gjesdal. Then on 1 January 1989, another small, unpopulated area of Time was transferred to Gjesdal.

Government
All municipalities in Norway, including Gjesdal, are responsible for primary education (through 10th grade), outpatient health services, senior citizen services, unemployment and other social services, zoning, economic development, and municipal roads. The municipality is governed by a municipal council of elected representatives, which in turn elect a mayor.  The municipality falls under the Sør-Rogaland District Court and the Gulating Court of Appeal.

Municipal council
The municipal council of Gjesdal is made up of 27 representatives that are elected to four year terms. Currently, the party breakdown is as follows:

Geography
Gjesdal municipality is located in the southern part of the Jæren district in Rogaland county. To the north and northwest, Gjesdal borders the municipality of Sandnes, to the east is Sirdal municipality (in Agder county), to the south is Bjerkreim municipality, and to the west is the municipality of Time.

Gjesdal sits at the head of the Høgsfjorden and along the south and east sides of the Frafjorden. The Månafossen waterfall, the largest waterfall in Rogaland county, is located in the Frafjord valley. There are several large lakes in the municipality such as Edlandsvatnet, Flassavatnet, Limavatnet, and Oltedalsvatnet. The Figgjoelva river has its headwaters in Gjesdal also.

Weather

Notable residents

 Liv Godin (1918 in Ålgård – 2012) a Norwegian missionary in DR Congo
 Finn E. Kydland  (born 1943 in Søyland) an economist, winner of Nobel Memorial Prize in 2004
 Olaug Bollestad (born 1961) a Norwegian nurse and politician, Mayor of Gjesdal, 2007–2013 
 Dagny Mellgren (born 1978 in Ålgård) footballer, scored the gold medal goal for Norway at the 2000 Summer Olympics
 Leo Moracchioli (born 1978 in Ålgård) a multi-instrumentalist heavy metal musician and producer based in Oltedal
 Håvard Rugland (born 1984 in Ålgård) a Norwegian American football placekicker, known as "Kickalicious"

References

External links

Municipal fact sheet from Statistics Norway 

 
Municipalities of Rogaland
1838 establishments in Norway